Greek Socialist Party (Greek: Ελληνικό Σοσιαλιστικό Κόμμα) was a Greek political party founded by Gerasimos Arsenis when he left Panhellenic Socialist Movement on April, 1987.

Among his members were the unionists Christos Kokkinovasilis and Dimitris Pipergias, Rovertos Spyropoulos and Nora Katseli. The party expressed those who were dissatisfied with the stabilization program of 1985-1987 of Costas Simitis. He took part in the election of June, 1989 and gained 0.21%. In the European election of 1989 the party received 43,654 votes and gained 0.66%. A few months later, Gerasimos Arsenis returned to Panhellenic Socialist Movement and the party dissolved.

Defunct political parties in Greece